Elpides Karditsas is a Greek women's football club from the city of Karditsa. It was founded in 1994 and currently competes in the Greek A Division known as Alpha Ethniki. The team finished in second position, behind their main rivals PAOK, in two consecutive seasons – 2011–12 and 2012–13. In 2013–14 they again finished second.

References

External links
 Elpides Karditsas Profile in UEFA
 

Association football clubs established in 1994
Women's football clubs in Greece
1994 establishments in Greece